Jony is the nickname of multiple footballers. It may refer to:

 Jony (footballer, born 1985), Spanish footballer
 Jonathan Menéndez (born 1994), Argentine footballer

See also 

 Joni (footballer) (born 1970), Angolan footballer
 Jonny (footballer) (born 1994), Spanish footballer